Nabih Youssef, S.E., F.A.S.C.E is an American structural engineer, most recognized for his work in earthquake engineering.

Education and working life
In 1967, Youssef received a B.S. in Structural Engineering from Cairo University. After emigrating to the United States he received a M.S. from C.S.U.-L.A. and then a postgraduate Diploma in Earthquake Engineering from U.C.L.A.

Youssef lead the engineering division at A.C. Martin Partners before founding his own firm, Nabih Youssef & Associates (NYA), in 1989.

Notable projects

L.A. Live! Hotel & Residences

The first of the 56 story L.A. LIVE's three development phases was completed late 2007 / early 2008 when the doors opened at Microsoft Theater, a 7,100 seat concert and awards show venue. Xbox Plaza (formerly Microsoft Square), a 40,000 sq. ft. open air space, featuring six 75-foot-towers with LED and static signage along with 1,500 parking spaces also debuted in phase one. It uses an advanced steel plate shear wall system to resist lateral loads and is the first building in Los Angeles to so.

The second phase began in late 2008 with The Novo (a 2,300 person venue), the Conga Room, Lucky Strike Lanes & Lounge, The GRAMMY Museum® and 2,000 more parking spaces. Restaurants opened throughout phase two, with all 13 eateries completed in 2009. Another notable phase two event was the first live broadcast from the ESPN West Coast Broadcast Center.

The last and final phase was completed in late 2009 with the grand opening of the 14-screen Regal Cinemas and in early 2010 with The Ritz-Carlton Hotel, Los Angeles, the JW Marriott Los Angeles L.A. LIVE and The Ritz-Carlton Residences at L.A.

Cathedral of Our Lady of the Angels

Cathedral of Our Lady of the Angels used base isolation to achieve a structure that would last 500 years.

Others
Cleveland
 Cleveland Museum of Art Expansion

Los Angeles
 Dodger Stadium Renovations
 J. Paul Getty Museum Villa
 Los Angeles City Hall Renovations
  Los Angeles Coliseum Renovations
 Los Angeles County Museum of Art
 Skirball Jewish Cultural Center

Washington, D.C.
 Walter E. Washington Convention Center

Contributions to field
Youssef pioneered the use of base isolation to seismically protect structures.  He is a Lecturer at the USC School of Architecture.  Additionally, Youssef has been involved in various industry and governmental panels, notably:

Congressional Office of Technology Assessment advisory panel member
Chair of the Vision 2000 Committee and the Seismology Committee of the Structural Engineers Association of California.
Chair of Project Restore, a non-profit organization dedicated to the historic restoration and revitalization of historic facilities in Los Angeles.

Honors
Recipient of two Design-Build Institute of America Public Sector Building merit awards in 2005.

See also
 List of structural engineers
 List of Copts
 Earthquake engineering structures

References

External links
 Nabih Youssef & Associates
 Cal State LA
 StructureMag

Structural engineers
American people of Coptic descent
American people of Egyptian descent
Earthquake engineering
Living people
Year of birth missing (living people)